Waldsteinia lobata, the piedmont barren strawberry, is a low-lying perennial herb with evergreen leaves that turn burgundy red in fall. The flower is yellow and the fruit is brown and dry.

References

Colurieae